Zhao Hongxu (Chinese: 赵泓旭; born 27 March 1991) is a Chinese football player.

Club career
In 2011, Zhao Hongxu started his professional footballer career with Shandong Luneng in the Chinese Super League. 
In February 2012, he transferred to Chinese Super League side Liaoning Whowin. He made his league debut for Liaoning on 28 September 2012 in a game against Tianjin Teda, coming on as a substitute for Wang Hao in the 63rd minute.

Club career statistics 
Statistics accurate as of match played 1 October 2018

References

1991 births
Living people
Chinese footballers
Footballers from Liaoning
Shandong Taishan F.C. players
Liaoning F.C. players
Chinese Super League players
Association football midfielders